Polyzonium is a genus of millipedes belonging to the family Polyzoniidae.

The species of this genus are found in Europe and Northern America.

Species:
 Polyzonium eburneum Verhoeff, 1907
 Polyzonium germanicum Brandt, 1837
 Polyzonium transsilvanicum Verhoeff, 1898

References

Polyzoniida
Millipede genera